"We'll Be Fine" is a song by Canadian recording artist Drake featuring American rapper Birdman from his second studio album Take Care (2011). It was to serve as the seventh single from the album, but its full release was cancelled, as was the official release of its music video, despite the trailer being released on January 15, 2012. The full video leaked the following year.

Music video
A music video was filmed for the track by filmmaker Mikael Columbu. The video didn't come out as the director and Drake planned and so the visuals were scrapped. The video and post were later deleted from Columbu's Vimeo channel and Drake's fan site. A 30-second trailer later appeared online, however. On December 7, 2013, the video leaked online with different music playing on Columbu's website.

Chart performance 
After Take Care was released in the United States on November 15, 2011, "We'll Be Fine" managed to chart in the Top 100 based on digital sales alone.

References

Drake (musician) songs
Birdman (rapper) songs
Songs written by Drake (musician)
Song recordings produced by T-Minus (record producer)
Song recordings produced by 40 (record producer)
2011 songs
Songs written by 40 (record producer)
Songs written by T-Minus (record producer)
Songs written by Birdman (rapper)
Songs written by Anthony Palman